ed2k may refer to:
 eDonkey network—file sharing network
 eDonkey2000—file sharing program
 ed2k URI scheme—links used by eDonkey2000

es:Ed2k